The Germany women's national field hockey team has represented the unified Germany since 1991. 

The team won the gold medal at the 2004 Summer Olympics in Athens, Greece, by defeating the Netherlands in the final.

Tournament records

Team

Current squad
Squad for the 2022 Women's FIH Hockey World Cup.

Head coach: Valentin Altenburg

Notable players
Britta Becker
Nadine Ernsting-Krienke
Franziska Hentschel
Natascha Keller
Fanny Rinne

Results

2021 Fixtures & Results

FIH Pro League

XXXII Olympic Games

Goalscorers

See also
East Germany women's national field hockey team
Germany men's national field hockey team
Germany women's national under-21 field hockey team

References

External links

FIH profile

Field hockey
National team
European women's national field hockey teams